Nanha Shikari is a 1973 Hindi family musical drama film starring Deb Mukherjee and Tanuja in pivotal roles. It is directed by Tanuja's husband Shomu Mukherjee.

Cast
 Tanuja
 Laxmi Chhaya
 Deb Mukherjee
 Iftekhar

Music
The music of the film was composed by Bappi Lahiri and lyrics were by Yogesh, S. H. Bihari and Gorukh Kanpuri. The songs were sung by Kishore Kumar, Asha Bhosle, Mukesh and Sushma Shrestha.

References

External links
 

1973 films
Films scored by Bappi Lahiri
1970s Hindi-language films
Films directed by Shomu Mukherjee